Caloptilia metadoxa is a moth of the family Gracillariidae. It is known from Meghalaya, India.

References

metadoxa
Moths of Asia
Moths described in 1908